Rincaleus is a Thracian god, known from a few epigraphic inscriptions found near Krinides, Philippi, Greece. He is identified with ancient Greek god Apollo and the Thracian Heros according to iconographic tradition of the bas-relief  The dedications were made by Roman citizens.The theonym is written in Latin. Probably Rincaleus is local deity and syncretized with Apollo.

The Latin text of the shown inscription:D(omino) Rinc(aleo) ex ip[erio]
L(ucius) Ac(cius) Venustus

References

Bibliography
 

Greek mythology of Thrace
Thracian gods